Layar is technology company based in Amsterdam, Netherlands

Layar may also refer to:
Layar (state constituency), in Malaysia
Layar LRT station, a railway station in Singapore

See also 
 Laya (disambiguation)